Helen of Galloway (fl. thirteenth century) was a daughter and co-heiress of Alan, Lord of Galloway (died 1234) and his first wife, a daughter of Roger de Lacy, Constable of Chester. Helen was the first wife of Roger de Quincy, Earl of Winchester (died 1264). Although Helen was the first of Roger's three wives, his only descendants were his three daughters by Helen. The eldest daughter, Margaret, married William de Ferrers, Earl of Derby (died 1254); the second daughter, Elizabeth (or Isabella), married Alexander Comyn, Earl of Buchan (died 1289); the third daughter, Helen, married Alan de la Zouche (died 1270).

Citations

References

 Subscription or UK public library membership required.
 Subscription or UK public library membership required.
 Subscription or UK public library membership required.

13th-century Scottish people
History of Galloway
Medieval Gaels from Scotland
People from Dumfries and Galloway
13th-century Scottish women
1234 deaths